Clinton Park may refer to the following places in the United States:

 Clinton Park, Houston, a neighborhood in Houston
 Clinton Park, a public park in Houston
 Clinton Park (Portland, Oregon)
 DeWitt Clinton Park, a public park in Manhattan, New York